SEK (Sidirodromoi Ellinikou Kratous, Hellenic State Railways) Class Κγ (or Class Kg; Kappa-gamma) is a class of 20 0-10-0 steam locomotives purchased from four Belgian locomotive manufacturers in 1929.

They were given the class letters "Kg" and numbers 861 to 880.

References

 http://balkanmodels.biz/forum/viewtopic.php?f=16&t=297

Κγ
0-10-0 locomotives
Steam locomotives of Greece
Railway locomotives introduced in 1929
Standard gauge locomotives of Greece